Independence Hall, originally the Dizengoff House is the site of the signing of Israel's Declaration of Independence. It is located on the historic Rothschild Boulevard in Tel Aviv, Israel. From 1932 to 1971 housing the Tel Aviv Museum of Art, it is currently a museum dedicated to the signing of the Israeli Declaration of Independence and the history of Tel Aviv.

Origins
At the vicinity of where Independence Hall now stands, sixty-six families gathered on April 11, 1909 to conduct a lottery for plots of land in a new Jewish neighborhood, to be known as Ahuzat Bayit. Meir and Zina Dizengoff acquired plot number 43, on which they built their home. Meir Dizengoff served as the head of the new neighborhood council. In 1910, at a general meeting, the residents of Ahuzat Bayit, inspired by Theodor Herzl's Altneuland (English: Old-New Land), unanimously decided to rename their neighborhood Tel Aviv. As the neighborhood grew and became a city, Dizengoff became its first mayor.

Tel Aviv Museum of Art

In 1930, after the death of his wife, Dizengoff donated his house to his beloved city of Tel Aviv and requested that it be turned into a museum. The house underwent extensive renovations and became the Tel Aviv Museum of Art in 1932. The museum moved to its current location in 1971.

Independence

In the main hall of the building, at 4 PM on May 14, 1948 (5 Iyar 5708), in the presence of the members of the Vaad Leumi (Jewish National Council) and the leaders of the Yishuv, David Ben-Gurion proclaimed the establishment of the State of Israel, eight hours before the British Mandate of Palestine was due to end.
After Ben-Gurion read the Declaration of Independence, Rabbi Fischman (Maimon) recited the Shehecheyanu blessing, and the Declaration was signed. The ceremony concluded with the singing of Hatikvah, now Israel's national anthem.

Bible Museum
The upper floors of the building houses a Bible museum, featuring archaeological artifacts and works of art with biblical themes.

Today
In 1978, Independence Hall was restored to resemble its appearance at the time of the declation of independence and opened to the public. It now houses exhibits on the signing of the declaration and the history of Tel Aviv-Yafo.

External links
 Independence Hall Israel
 Independence Hall

Modernist architecture in Israel
City museums in Israel
Buildings and structures in Tel Aviv
1932 establishments in Mandatory Palestine
1978 establishments in Israel
Museums in Tel Aviv
Israel National Heritage Site
Religious museums in Asia
Bible-themed museums, zoos, and botanical gardens
Israeli Declaration of Independence